Bell Farmhouse is a historic home located at Newark in New Castle County, Delaware.  The farmhouse was built about 1845 and is a two-story, gable-roofed brick building with an original two-story ell in the rear.  It features a massive Doric columned wrap-around porch.  Also on the property is a smokehouse, carriage house, and shed.

It was added to the National Register of Historic Places in 1983.

References

Houses on the National Register of Historic Places in Delaware
Houses completed in 1845
Houses in Newark, Delaware
National Register of Historic Places in New Castle County, Delaware